Jay Katz may refer to:

 Jay Katz (1920–2008), American medical ethicist
 A nickname for Jaimie Leonarder
 A pseudonym for Jim Keith

See also
 Jay
 Katz (disambiguation)